The 1999 Pontiac Excitement 400 was the 11th stock car race of the 1999 NASCAR Winston Cup Series season and the 45th iteration of the event. The race was held on Saturday, May 15, 1999, in Richmond, Virginia, at Richmond International Raceway, a 0.75 miles (1.21 km) D-shaped oval. The race took the scheduled 400 laps to complete. At race's end, Robert Yates Racing driver Dale Jarrett would manage to make a pass for the lead with 32 to go and hold onto the lead to win his 19th career NASCAR Winston Cup Series victory and his first victory of the season. To fill out the podium, Roush Racing driver Mark Martin and Joe Gibbs Racing driver Bobby Labonte would finish second and third, respectively.

Background 

Richmond International Raceway (RIR) is a 3/4-mile (1.2 km), D-shaped, asphalt race track located just outside Richmond, Virginia in Henrico County. It hosts the Monster Energy NASCAR Cup Series and Xfinity Series. Known as "America's premier short track", it formerly hosted a NASCAR Camping World Truck Series race, an IndyCar Series race, and two USAC sprint car races.

Entry list 

 (R) denotes rookie driver.

Practice

First practice 
The first practice session was held on Friday, May 14, at 11:00 AM EST. The session would last for one hour and 15 minutes.

Second practice 
The second practice session was held on Friday, May 14, at 2:30 PM EST. The session would last for two hours.

Qualifying 
Qualifying was held on Saturday, May 15, at 1:00 PM EST. Each driver would have two laps to set a fastest time; the fastest of the two would count as their official qualifying lap. Positions 1-36 would be decided on time, while positions 37-43 would be based on provisionals. Six spots are awarded by the use of provisionals based on owner's points. The seventh is awarded to a past champion who has not otherwise qualified for the race. If no past champion needs the provisional, the next team in the owner points will be awarded a provisional.

Three drivers would fail to qualify: Dave Marcis, Buckshot Jones, and Hut Stricklin.

Full qualifying results 

*Time not available.

Race results

References 

1999 NASCAR Winston Cup Series
NASCAR races at Richmond Raceway
May 1999 sports events in the United States
1999 in sports in Virginia